The 1921 East Dorset by-election was a parliamentary by-election held for the House of Commons constituency of East Dorset on 16 April 1921.

Vacancy
The by-election was caused by the appointment of the sitting MP for East Dorset, Freddie Guest, to the office of Secretary of State for Air. Under the Parliamentary procedures of the day, he was obliged to resign his seat and fight a by-election.

Candidates
Guest re-contested the seat for the Coalition government of David Lloyd George. As its representative, he was supported by Liberals and Unionists.
He was to be opposed for Labour by the Reverend Fred Hopkins, a Methodist minister and former brickyard worker from the age of just ten years  but Hopkins was reported to be very ill at the time for nominations and the local Labour Party decided not to contest the by-election. Hopkins stood for Parliament a number of times for Labour in different constituencies but was never elected.

The result
The election was uncontested and Guest was returned unopposed. At this time the Coalition was experiencing a good run of by-election results and Labour was making little headway in opposing the government.

References

See also
List of United Kingdom by-elections 
United Kingdom by-election records 

East Dorset by-election
By-elections to the Parliament of the United Kingdom in Dorset constituencies
Unopposed ministerial by-elections to the Parliament of the United Kingdom in English constituencies
East Dorset by-election
20th century in Dorset
East Dorset by-election